Edmunds Pīlāgs (7 June 1927 – 21 May 1995) was a Latvian sprinter. He competed in the men's 400 metres at the 1952 Summer Olympics representing the Soviet Union.

References

External links
 

1927 births
1995 deaths
Athletes (track and field) at the 1952 Summer Olympics
Latvian male sprinters
Olympic athletes of the Soviet Union
Place of birth missing
Soviet male sprinters